Omichund or Umichand (died 1767) was a native merchant of Bengal Nawabi period in India who was one of the principal authors of the conspiracy against Nawab and associated with the treaty negotiated by Robert Clive before the Battle of Plassey in 1757.

Biography

Omichund had long been resident at Calcutta (Kolkata), where he had acquired a large fortune by providing the investment for the British East India Company, and also by acting as intermediary between the English and the local court at Murshidabad. In a letter of William Watts of later date, he is represented as saying to the Nawab (Siraj ud-Daulah):
 “He had lived under the English protection these forty years; that he never knew them once to break their agreement, to the truth of which he took his oath, by touching a Brahman's foot; and that if a lie could be proved in England upon any one, they were spit upon and never trusted.”

Several houses owned by him in Calcutta are mentioned in connection with the fighting that preceded the tragedy of the Black Hole in 1756, and it is on record that he suffered heavy financial losses at that time. He had been arrested by the English on suspicion of treachery, but afterwards he was forward in giving help to the fugitives and also valuable advice.

On the recapture of Calcutta, he was sent by Robert Clive to accompany Watts as agent at Murshidabad. It seems to have been through his influence that the nawab gave reluctant consent to Clive's attack on Chandernagore. Later, when the treaty with Mir Jafar was being negotiated circa 1757, he put in a claim for 5% on all the treasure to be recovered, under threat of disclosing the plot. To defeat him, two copies of the treaty were drawn up: the one, the true treaty, omitting his claim; the other containing it, to be shown to him, which Admiral Charles Watson refused to sign, but Clive directed the admiral's signature to be appended. When the truth was revealed to Omichund after Plassey, Macaulay states (following Robert Orme) that he sank gradually into idiocy, languished a few months, and then purportedly died. However, as a matter of fact, he survived for ten years, until 1767; and by his will he bequeathed £2000 to the Foundling Hospital (where his name may be seen in the list of benefactors as “a black merchant of Calcutta”) and also to the Magdalen Hospital in London.

Lord Clive testified and defended himself thus before the House of Commons of Parliament on 10 May 1773, during the Parliamentary inquiry into his conduct in India:

References

1767 deaths
People from Kolkata
18th-century Indian people
Year of birth unknown